Mycetomorpha is a genus of crustaceans belonging to the monotypic family Mycetomorphidae.

The species of this genus are found in Alaska and Japan.

Species:

Mycetomorpha albatrossi 
Mycetomorpha vancouverensis

References

Barnacles
Maxillopoda genera